"Fat" is a song by "Weird Al" Yankovic. It is a parody of "Bad" by Michael Jackson and is Yankovic's second parody of a Jackson song, the first being "Eat It", a parody of Jackson's "Beat It". "Fat" is the first song on Yankovic's Even Worse album.

The video won a Grammy Award for Best Concept Music Video in 1988.

Background
Yankovic was inspired to create "Fat" while watching the "Bad" music video, when he had an epiphany that a parody of that song titled "Fat" would be a good sequel to "Eat It" (a previous Weird Al Michael Jackson parody). While watching the "Bad" video, he imagined an obese version of himself trying to get through the turnstiles on a subway, and resolved that he would do it.

Concert version
When performing in concert, Yankovic wears a costume that makes his body appear pudgy, along with a mask that makes his face look fat. Due to undergoing laser vision correction surgery, he no longer needs to wear glasses, though he wears glasses with non-prescription plastic lenses in order to help hold on the mask.

Yankovic elected not to perform the song or his other Jackson parody, "Eat It", during the Strings Attached Tour in the wake of the HBO documentary Leaving Neverland, in which two men claimed Jackson had sexually abused them when they were children. "I don't know if that's going to be permanent or not," Yankovic said of the decision. "But we just felt that with what's happened recently with the HBO documentaries, we didn't want anybody to feel uncomfortable."

Track listing
 "Fat" – 3:36
 "You Make Me" – 3:04

Music video
Directed by Jay Levey, the video for "Fat" parodies various elements of the "Bad" video by Jackson; Yankovic was able to get permission from Michael Jackson to use the same subway set from "Bad" for the video, which had yet to be struck in Culver City. Jackson had built an exact replica of the original set for the movie Moonwalker to be used in the segment called "Badder", and before striking it, he offered to allow Yankovic to use it.

The fat suit was created by Camilla Henneman. The makeup was created by Kevin Yagher, who later worked with Yankovic on the film UHF. Latex bladders were glued to Yankovic's face, along with similar air pockets through his clothes.

Chart performance

Weekly charts

Year-end charts

See also
List of singles by "Weird Al" Yankovic
List of songs by "Weird Al" Yankovic

References

External links
"Weird Al" Yankovic - Fat - Official music video on YouTube

1988 singles
1988 songs
American pop rock songs
Cultural depictions of Michael Jackson
Grammy Award for Best Concept Music Video
Music videos directed by Jay Levey
Scotti Brothers Records singles
Songs written by Michael Jackson
Songs with lyrics by "Weird Al" Yankovic
"Weird Al" Yankovic songs